Jason Philip Shackell (born 27 September 1983) is a former English professional footballer who last played for Lincoln City. Shackell primarily plays as a centre-back.

Career

Norwich City
Shackell is a product of the Norwich City youth academy, which he joined in 2000. He made his senior debut for on 5 April 2003 in a 2–1 defeat at Derby County, when he played at left-back following an injury to Adam Drury. Although Shackell's preferred – and best – position is central defender, his first few appearances were at left-back when Drury was either injured or suspended.

He added further experience the following season as Norwich won the First Division championship. He did not feature in the club's opening months in the Premier League but returned to the team in February 2005 in a home game against Manchester City. Although Norwich lost 3–2, he acquitted himself well and kept his place in the centre of defence for the remainder of the season, but could not prevent relegation.

The scene was set for Shackell to continue his progress in the 2005–06 season. However, a pre-season illness and a subsequent run of injuries caused him to miss four months of the campaign. However, the season brought him his first goal for Norwich on 17 October 2006 against Birmingham City, proving to be the winning goal. He scored two further goals that season, against Preston North End and Luton Town, but the club were unable to challenge for an immediate return to the top division.

After undergoing another ankle operation during Summer 2006, he returned to be a virtual ever-present in the next season. With the arrival of Peter Grant as manager during the season, Shackell was appointed captain at the start of the 2007–08 season. In October 2007, he signed a new contract that was due to have kept him at Carrow Road until 2010. However, his season took a downturn in December, when new manager Glenn Roeder relieved him of the captaincy.

Shackell lost his place in the Norwich side at the start of the new season after several new defensive signings arrived. On 1 September 2008, he left for fellow Championship side Wolverhampton Wanderers, signing a four-year deal for an undisclosed fee believed to be around £1 million.

Wolverhampton Wanderers
However, he was unable to stake a regular place in the Molineux side, and fell down the pecking order. He returned to his former club Norwich on 10 February 2009, for the remainder of the 2008–09 season. The season proved unique for Shackell as he was relegated from the Championship, but having played 12 games earlier in the season for Wolves before his loan to Norwich, had done enough to earn a winners' medal when Wolves won the Championship on 25 April.

Out of favour at Wolves, he spent the 2009–10 season on loan at Championship side Doncaster Rovers.

Barnsley

On 12 May 2010 he left Molineux, when he signed for Barnsley for an undisclosed fee. He served as club captain, replacing Stephen Foster. Shackell's first goal for the club came in the 2–0 victory over Middlesbrough at Oakwell on 28 August 2010. Shackell headed home to give Barnsley a 1–0 lead in the 28th minute.

After a set of impressive performances during the 2010–11 season (where he won the Player of The Year award), Shackell was heavily linked with transfer moves away from Oakwell, with fellow Championship clubs Burnley, Derby County, Hull City, Portsmouth and newly promoted Premier League outfit Swansea City all interested in the player.

Derby County had two bids for the player rejected, the second bid estimated to be in the region of £700,000. Derby went back with an improved bid on 15 June 2011, believed to be £750k up front, potentially rising to £1m. This bid was accepted by Barnsley on 17 June 2011.

Derby County
Shackell was confirmed as a Derby County player on 21 June 2011, signing a three-year contract.
Shackell scored on his league debut for Derby County in a 2–1 win over Birmingham City on the opening day of the 2011–12 season, heading the equaliser from a Ben Davies freekick. He was also the Rams captain for the game and won man of the match. Derby enjoyed their best start to a season for over 100 years, winning their first four games, and were in the top three going into the start of the October international break. Shackell proved key to this success and his early season form was rewarded with a nomination for the Championship Player of the Month award, though he eventually lost out to Middlesbrough's Matthew Bates. Shackell started every game of the 2011–12 season at centre back and became captain of the team after Shaun Barker was injured in the 1–0 win against Nottingham Forest in mid-March 2012. Shackell was an ever-present in the Derby County side during the season and was runner up in the fans Player of the Season vote. In the close season, Derby rejected four bids from three clubs, with Burnley and Cardiff City thought to have made bids On 4 July 2012, it was confirmed the Derby County had accepted a bid for Shackell from Burnley believed to be £1.1 million.

Burnley
On 5 July 2012, Shackell signed for fellow Championship side Burnley for an undisclosed fee, on a four-year contract.
Later that month it was announced that he would become Burnley captain. In March 2014 he scored the equalizing goal for Burnley in a 2–1 win over fierce East Lancashire rivals Blackburn at Ewood Park. The result was the Claret's first win in that fixture in 35 years. Shackell went on to guide Burnley to 2nd in the Championship and promotion to the Premier League in the 2013–14 season.

Return to Derby County
On 23 July 2015, Shackell rejoined his former club Derby on a three-year deal for an undisclosed fee, understood to be around £3 million.

On 25 January 2018, Shackell joined fellow Championship side Millwall on loan for the remainder of the 2017–18 season.

He was released by Derby at the end of the 2017–18 season.

Lincoln City
On 9 August 2018, Shackell joined Lincoln City. Shackell came on to make his debut as a substitute against Swindon Town on 11 August before making his first start for the imps on 14 August, and scored in the 5th minute. On 28 May 2020, it was announced Shackell will leave the club at the end of his current contract.

Career statistics

Honours
Wolverhampton Wanderers
Football League Championship: 2008–09

Burnley
Football League Championship runner-up: 2013–14

Lincoln City
EFL League Two: 2018–19

Individual
PFA Team of the Year: 2013–14 Championship
PFA Team of the Year: 2018-19 League Two

References

External links

Jason Shackell player profile at ex-canaries.co.uk

1983 births
Living people
People from Stevenage
English footballers
Association football defenders
Norwich City F.C. players
Wolverhampton Wanderers F.C. players
Doncaster Rovers F.C. players
Barnsley F.C. players
Derby County F.C. players
Burnley F.C. players
Millwall F.C. players
Lincoln City F.C. players
English Football League players
Premier League players